William John Dowling (8 April 1909 – 10 January 1967) was an Australian rules footballer who played for North Melbourne and Footscray in the Victorian Football League (VFL).

Dowling played with North Melbourne between 1927 and 1931, topping their goalkicking in the 1929 season. He finished his VFL career at Footscray; midway through his second season with the club he was picked up by Brunswick in the VFA, who were struggling and sought experienced players.

External links

 

1909 births
1967 deaths
Australian rules footballers from Melbourne
North Melbourne Football Club players
Western Bulldogs players
Brunswick Football Club players
South Yarra Football Club players
People from Brunswick, Victoria